Anthony the Hermit (ca. 468 – ca. 520), also known as Anthony of Lérins, is a Christian who is venerated as a saint. He was born in the ancient Roman province of Valeria (now Hungary), then part of the Hunnic Empire. When he was eight years old, his father died and he was entrusted to the care of the holy Abbot Severinus of Noricum, in modern-day Austria. Upon the death of Severinus in 482, Anthony was sent to Germany and put in the care of his uncle, Constantius, an early Bishop of Lorsch. While there, Anthony is thought to have become a monk at the age of twenty.

In 488, at about 20 years of age, Anthony moved to Italy to take up an eremitical life with a small group of hermits living on an island in Lake Como. He was eventually joined by numerous disciples seeking to emulate his holiness and he chose to seek greater solitude in Gaul. He lived in various solitary places until two years before his death he became a monk at the Abbey of Lérins, where he became well known locally for the holiness of his life and the miracles he had performed.

Anthony is honoured on 28 December by the Roman Rite of the Catholic Church and commemorated also on that same day by the Eastern Orthodox Churches.

See also

Anthony the Great
Mary of Egypt
Poustinia

References

External links
Western Orthodoxy blog

5th-century Christian saints
6th-century Christian saints
French Christian monks
French Roman Catholic saints
German Roman Catholic saints
Hermits
Italian hermits
Italian Roman Catholic saints
Romans from Pannonia
Miracle workers